FC Barcelona's 2001–02 season was the second under the presidency of Joan Gaspart and the single full season of management by Carles Rexach (who had replaced Lorenzo Serra Ferrer in the latter part of the previous campaign).

The summer of 2001 saw long-serving team captain Josep Guardiola leave the club, while many transfer deals were concluded to give a new face to the squad with the signings of Roberto Bonano, Javier Saviola, Patrik Andersson, Francesco Coco, Geovanni, Philippe Christanval and Fábio Rochemback. This was also the final season at Barcelona of veteran players like Sergi Barjuán, Abelardo and the talismanic Rivaldo.

Barcelona had a mediocre campaign in La Liga, finishing in 4th place, 11 points below eventual champions Valencia; in Europe, on the other hand, they produced some very good performances, reaching the semi-finals of the UEFA Champions League, where they were eliminated by fierce rivals (and eventual winners) Real Madrid. Patrick Kluivert was the club's top scorer in all competitions, with 25 goals.

Squad
Correct as of 3 October 2009.

Transfers

In

Total spending:   €90.1 million

Out

Total income:   €31.7 million
{|

Competitions

Pre-season and friendlies

La Liga

League table

Results by round

Matches

Copa del Rey

Round of 64

UEFA Champions League

Third qualifying round

First group stage

Group F

Second group stage

Group B

Quarter-finals

Semifinals

Statistics

Players statistics

Top scorers

See also
FC Barcelona
2001–02 UEFA Champions League
2001–02 La Liga
2001–02 Copa del Rey

References

External links
 
 FCBarcelonaweb.co.uk English Speaking FC Barcelona Supporters
 ESPNsoccernet: Barcelona Team Page 
 FC Barcelona (Spain) profile
 uefa.com - UEFA Champions League
 Web Oficial de la Liga de Fútbol Profesional
 
 

FC Barcelona seasons
Barcelona